Christian Järdler (born 3 June 1982) is a Swedish manager or Örebro SK and former footballer.

Career
Starting his career in Ängelholms FF, he then moved at the age of 17 to Helsingborgs IF, after being on trial at Halmstads BK. During the middle of the 2005 season he decided to leave Helsingborg and sign for Turkish side Gençlerbirliği. However, his spell with the club lasted only for half a season before Järdler returned home to Sweden and Malmö FF. During his time in Malmö, he suffered a serious injury in a league match against Hammarby IF, when he collided with teammate Raoul Kouakou. The collision resulted in a broken cheekbone and a severe headache, which haunted him afterwards.

In early 2009 Järdler left Malmö FF and signed for league rival Halmstads BK. Järdler competed primarily with Per "Texas" Johansson over the leftback position, and when "Texas" left Halmstad after the 2010 season he became the regular at the position. The start of the 2011 season was a nightmare for Järdler as the headaches returned and forced him miss half the season. Despite his return, the club was relegated by the end of the season. As Halmstad set to play in Superettan 2012, Järdler decided to stay and help the club return to Allsvenskan, and when the season was over he decided to sign a new contract with the club. In the middle of 2013 Järdler was left out of the match squad for unknown reasons. He later confirmed that the headache had returned following a clash during training, which had frightened him. On 12 September 2013 Järdler announced his immediate retirement from football due to his headaches.

Personal life
His father, Ingemar Järdler, also played for Halmstads BK, between 1977 and 1978.

References

External links
 
 
 
 

1982 births
Living people
Association football defenders
Swedish footballers
Sweden under-21 international footballers
Helsingborgs IF players
Gençlerbirliği S.K. footballers
Malmö FF players
Halmstads BK players
Allsvenskan players
Süper Lig players
Swedish expatriate footballers
Expatriate footballers in Turkey
Swedish expatriate sportspeople in Turkey
Swedish football managers
Östers IF managers
Mjällby AIF managers
Örebro SK managers
Allsvenskan managers
Superettan managers